First Peoples Mountain (formerly Mount Doane) el.  is a mountain peak in the Absaroka Range in Yellowstone National Park. The peak was formerly named for Lieutenant Gustavus Cheyney Doane, a U.S. Army cavalry officer who escorted the Washburn-Langford-Doane Expedition into Yellowstone in 1870. During that expedition, Doane and Nathaniel P. Langford ascended several peaks east of Yellowstone Lake. The name was changed to First Peoples Mountain in 2022.

Washburn-Langford-Doane Expedition

Henry D. Washburn, the leader of the expedition named a peak for Doane, but that peak's name was later changed to Mount Schurz.  Mount Doane was officially named by the Hayden Geological Survey of 1871 to honor the first truly official report of an exploration of the Yellowstone region that Doane wrote after the Washburn expedition.  Doane also participated in the 1st Hayden expedition in 1871.

Doane's account of his and Langford's ascent into the Absaroka Range (The Peak ascended is today's Colter Peak):

Renaming
Various groups of Native Americans had proposed renaming the mountain in 2017 and 2018, to First Peoples Mountain. The Great Plains Tribal Chairman's Association stated that Gustavius Doane should not be honored because of his role in murdering 200 Native American people, predominantly women and children who were sick with smallpox, in the Marias Massacre.

Based of suggestions by the Rocky Mountain Tribal Council, the Wyoming Board of Geographic names, and the National Park Service, the name "First Peoples Mountain" was forwarded to the Board of Geographic Names. In June 2022 the new name was affirmed by a vote of 15–0.

See also
 Mountains and mountain ranges of Yellowstone National Park

Notes

Mountains of Wyoming
Mountains of Yellowstone National Park
Mountains of Park County, Wyoming